Adria K. Lawrence is an American political scientist and the Aronson Associate Professor of International Studies and Political Science at Johns Hopkins University. She is known for her expertise on colonialism, nationalism, conflict, collective action, and Middle Eastern and North African politics.

Her book, Imperial Rule and the Politics of Nationalism, won the 2015 J. David Greenstone Book Prize, the 2015 L. Carl Brown Book Prize and the 2014 Jervis-Schroeder Best Book Award.

Books
 Imperial Rule and the Politics of Nationalism: Anti-Colonial Protest in the French Empire, Cambridge University Press, 2013, 
 Rethinking Violence: States and Non-State Actors in Conflict (Co-edited with Erica Chenoweth), BCSIA Studies in International Security Series, MIT Press, 2010,

References

External links
 Adria K. Lawrence at Johns Hopkins University

Johns Hopkins University faculty
Yale University faculty
American international relations scholars
University of Chicago alumni
Vassar College alumni
Living people
American women political scientists
American political scientists
American women academics
Year of birth missing (living people)
21st-century American women